, is a Japanese light novel series written by Daisuke Suzuki, with illustrations by Gekka Urū. The series is published by Media Factory since December 2010 and ended on January 25, 2019 with a total of 12 volumes released. There are two manga adaptation series, both were serialized in Media Factory's Monthly Comic Alive magazine. An anime adaptation by Silver Link aired in Japan from October 5 to December 21, 2012.

Premise
After six years of living apart due to the death of their parents, the Himenokōji twins, Akito and Akiko, are finally reunited when Akito desires to live as a member of the family once more. Although things are fine at first, Akiko begins to express her incestuous love for her older brother, who only sees her as his little sister. Things become more complicated for her when more girls move in with the siblings.

Characters

 Akito recently transferred to Saint Liliana High School where he is placed in class 2A. His twin sister, from whom he has been separated for six years, is a student at the school. Akito has a laid-back personality and hopes to live a calm, normal life, but he will work with his full strength to achieve a goal. He started to take care of his sister when they were younger, however when their parents died, the siblings were separated. Six years later, he moved out of the Takanomiya household (the people who adopted him after he was separated from Akiko) to live on his own and was finally able to reunite with his sister, only to find out that she has a brother complex which had developed while they were separated. It is later revealed that he was actually adopted by his former parents, and therefore has no blood relationship with his sister, but he has chosen to keep this as a secret, especially from her. He loves to tease Akiko and watching others tease her. Akito is quite protective of Akiko, and people around him often comment that Akito has a serious sister complex, although he insists that he only sees her as his little sister. He has secretly made a living by writing erotic novels of brother-sister incest under the pen name "Kōichirō Shindo", which are very popular since before the siblings started living together. He uses his relationship with his sister as an inspiration for his novels, with the characters' names being very similar to their own. He was given the job of Student Council "Vice-Assistant of Proxy of Secretary" so that the girls on the Council could spend more time with him. Arashi happily claims that the position was fabricated for her underground lover; technically, he is the assistant of Akiko, the student council secretary.

A Saint Liliana High School second year student. Akiko is Akito's sister, is very pretty and has polite manners. Akiko was adopted by the Arisugawa family when she and Akito were separated after their parents died. She has a very serious brother-complex, and is making every effort to seduce Akito. She is also very proud of her brother complex and makes no effort in hiding it. At the same time she denies that her brother in turn has a sister-complex. She is the secretary of Saint Liliana High School Student Council and does not like it when Akito interacts with other student council members. She doesn't know that Akito has no blood relationship with her and believes that they are twins. She is a fan of Kōichirō Shindo, and wishes that her brother would be as aggressive as the brother in Kōichirō Shindo's novel. She hasn't noticed that the beginning of his novel is based on their relationship nor does she know that Kōichirō Shindo is actually her brother.

A Saint Liliana High School second year student and the Vice-President of the Student Council. She is the daughter of the owner of Nasuhara industry, a world-wide company. Anastasia is half-Russian and half-American with blonde twin tails. She has a cold personality and often asks strange questions, for example asking Akito if he was a cherry boy (a term for virgin) when they first met. She is Akiko's rival and proud that she wins a little in almost everything, including height, grades, breast size, rank during the Miss Saint Liliana High School Election, and Student Council rank. However, she is extremely bad at house chores due to her upbringing in a wealthy family, to the point that she will gladly admit it and try to escape from doing them. She also loves cute things, and not only keeps many plushies in her room, but also loves to play with Arisa. Despite being Akiko's rival, she gets along very well with Akito and confessed to him on his first day at school. Akito hasn't had a chance to answer her due to the chaotic situation that the confession brought about. She demands that Akito call her Ana, but teases him whenever he does so (because ana (穴) means hole in Japanese).

Akito's childhood friend. Despite having a boyish name and way of talking, Ginbei is a girl and secretly has feelings for Akito. Due to her merchant family tradition, she was raised as a boy and not allowed to take a job herself, living only on her family's financial support. She later transferred to Saint Liliana High School (to be closer to Akito) and became the accountant of the Student Council. Despite the fact that she moved and transferred schools to follow him, Akito often refers to her as his best (normal) friend, which greatly disappoints her. She has a habit of mumbling about Akito's ignorance whenever he overlooks her feelings.

A Saint Liliana High School third year student and the President of the Student Council, Arashi wears a ponytail, has heterochromia and is seen often wearing an eyepatch over her right eye. She is also often seen carrying a real katana. She has the best grades among the 3rd year students and is a powerful leader, being able not only to handle most of the Student Council chores by herself, but also to take control of most of the school's activities. She is bisexual and very sexually aggressive, claiming she has had over 30 lovers, thus gaining the nickname "The Predator". However, later in the story, she decides to peacefully break up with her lovers in order to make the Student Council into her harem. She also has the habit of referring to Akito as either her underground lover or sex slave. She is actually Akito's cousin from before his adoption by Akiko's parents, and is aware that Akito was adopted by her family. She is also the only one on the Student Council who knows that Akito is Kōichirō Shindo.

The daughter of Akito's second adoptive family and also his fiancée. Arisa/Alisa is a genius; despite being only 12 years old, she has already graduated from a famous university, and her thesis was published in a famous journal. She is very good at household chores. At the end of the 4th novel, she moves in with the student council members. While most of the student council members say that the engagement doesn't count due to her age, Akiko views her as a love rival. However, after arguing over which of them is better for Akito, the two of them decide to work together as they have noticed that Akito sees both of them as his sisters rather than as potential love interests. She has a habit of going silent and showing her emotions on her face when she is upset, which is so cute that people who see it can't resist accepting her will. She also has the habit of stripping naked in her sleep.

Kōichirō Shindo's personal editor, Kaoruko worries that Akito has a sister complex and is trying to fix the situation. Kaoruko worries about this is because of the way Akito writes about BroXSis doujins. The two main characters in his novel even sharing a similar name to his and Akiko. She tries at first to seduce Akito at the office when they were alone together, but was mistaken by Akito as Kaoruko imitating a story that he read.

Media

Light novel
OniAi started as a Japanese light novel series, written by Daisuke Suzuki, with illustrations by Gekka Urū. The series is published by Media Factory under their MF Bunko J imprint. The series' first volume was released on December 21, 2010,
and the last volume was released on January 25, 2019.
A drama CD was released bundled with the limited edition of the seventh volume, published on September 22, 2012.

Manga
A manga adaptation series by Kurō Rokushō was serialized betweenin the December 2011 and July 2015 issues of Media Factory's seinen manga magazine Monthly Comic Alive and has been compiled in seven volumes, between February 23, 2012, and March 23, 2015. A manga series by Akira Yamane, titled  was also published in Monthly Comic Alive between its July 2012 and March 2013 issues. Its first volume was released on November 22, 2012.

Anime
A 12-episode anime television series adaptation, directed by Keiichiro Kawaguchi and produced by studio Silver Link, aired in Japan between October 5 and December 21, 2012, and was later simulcasted by Funimation.

The series was released on Blu-ray Disc and DVD in Japan in 6 volumes between December 2012 and May 2013.

A North American Blu-ray/DVD release by Funimation with subtitles in English was released on December 31, 2013. The series performed well enough to be a financial success for Funimation, and it led Funimation to do more subtitle-only Blu-ray/DVD releases in the future.

Episode list

References

External links
  
  
 

2010 Japanese novels
2011 manga
2012 anime television series debuts
Anime and manga based on light novels
Funimation
Harem anime and manga
Light novels
Media Factory manga
MF Bunko J
Kadokawa Dwango franchises
Romantic comedy anime and manga
Seinen manga
Silver Link
Television shows based on light novels
Incest in anime and manga